Bjelke is a surname. Notable people with the surname include:

Bjelke (Dano-Norwegian family)
Bjelke-Petersen, the name of an Australian family of both Danish and Swedish descent
Bjelke-Petersen Dam, built 1984–1988, creating the lake called "Barambah" after the original property in the region
Flo Bjelke-Petersen (1920–2017), Lady Bjelke-Petersen, Australian politician
Jens Tillufssøn Bjelke, Danish-Norwegian nobleman and a feudal lord of Jemtland, Norway
Joh Bjelke-Petersen KCMG (1911–2005), New Zealand-born Australian politician
Koowarta v Bjelke-Petersen, significant court case in the High Court of Australia
Marie Bjelke Petersen (1874–1969), Danish-born Australian novelist and physical culture teacher

See also Bielke.